id Tech 7 is a multiplatform proprietary game engine developed by id Software. As part of the id Tech series of game engines, it is the successor to id Tech 6. The software was first demonstrated at QuakeCon 2018 as part of the id Software announcement of Doom Eternal.

Technology
id Tech 7 features ten times the geometric detail, and higher texture fidelity of id Tech 6. Moreover the capabilities of the game engine allow it to have a new system called "Destructible Demons", in which enemies' bodies become progressively destroyed and deteriorated in combat as they suffer damage. On PC, id Tech 7 supports Vulkan rendering only. Ray tracing and DLSS were added in June 2021. According to engine developer Axel Gneiting, the engine doesn't have a "main thread"; everything is implemented as jobs.

Improvements in comparison to id Tech 6
 1 million fewer lines of code mostly due to the removal of the OpenGL render-engine
 Unified HDR lighting and shadowing
 Full HDR-support on PS4, PS4 Pro, PS5, Xbox One S, Xbox One X, Xbox Series S, Xbox Series X, PC and Stadia
 Multi PBR material compositing, blending, and painting
 Increased texture fidelity and geometric detail due to removal of MegaTexture pipeline, used since id Tech 4
 Enhanced global illumination quality
 Majorly improved particle system as more particles are running on the GPU, which allows for bigger explosions, more atmospheric volumetrics and more vibrant particle effects
 The framerate limit has been upped to 1000 FPS. The frame limit was 250 FPS in id Tech 6.
 Rewritten jobs-system to use all available CPU-cores more efficiently
 Improved post-processing effects, more detailed anti-aliasing and improved motion blur
 Support for gameplay areas twice the size of those in id Tech 6
 Improved image streaming
 Expanded decal system
 Improved LOD system
 New GPU triangle-, light- and occlusion-culling system to not render what isn't on-screen
 Dramatically improved compression
 Improved level loading times, also after death
 DLSS 2.3.0
 Ray-traced reflections on PlayStation 5, Xbox Series X (not available on Xbox Series S) and PCs with hardware accelerated ray tracing
 Variable rate shading on Xbox Series X and Xbox Series S

Games using id Tech 7
 Doom Eternal (2020) – id Software

See also
 First-person shooter engine
 id Tech 6
 List of game engines

References

3D graphics software
Game engines that support Vulkan (API)
Global illumination software
Id Tech
Video game engines